Wiradjuri (many other spellings, see Wiradjuri) is a Pama–Nyungan language of the Wiradhuric subgroup. It is the traditional language of the Wiradjuri people of Australia. A progressive revival is underway, with the language being taught in schools.  Wiraiari and Jeithi may have been dialects.

Reclamation
The Wiradjuri language is taught in primary schools, secondary schools and at TAFE in the towns of Parkes and Forbes & Condobolin. Northern Wiradjuri schools such as Peak Hill, Dubbo (several schools), Narromine, Wellington, Gilgandra, Trangie, Geurie are taught Wiradjuri by AECG  Language & Culture Educators. All lessons include both indigenous and non-indigenous Australians. As of 2017 the language is also being taught in Young, where it has been observed as having a positive impact on the number of pupils self-identifying as Aboriginal. Charles Sturt University also offers a two-year course in Wiradjuri language, heritage, and culture, focusing on language reclamation. This course, which commenced in 2014, was developed by Wiradjuri Elder, Dr Stan Grant Senior, as part of their Wiradjuri Language and Cultural Heritage Recovery Project.

Dictionary
The process of reclaiming the language was greatly assisted by the publication in 2005 of A First Wiradjuri Dictionary by elder Dr Stan Grant Senior and academic Dr John Rudder. Rudder described the dictionary: "The Wiradjuri Dictionary has three main sections in just over 400 B5 pages. The first two sections, English to Wiradjuri, and Wiradjuri to English, have about 5,000 entries each. The third sections lists Names of Things grouped in categories such as animals, birds, plants, climate, body parts, colours. In addition to those main sections the dictionary contains an introduction to accurate pronunciation, a basic grammar of the language and a sample range of sentence types." A revised edition, holding over 8,000 words, was published in 2010 and launched in Wagga Wagga, with the launch described by the member for Wagga Wagga to the New South Wales Parliament. A mobile app based on the book is also available for iOS, Android and a web based version. A Grammar of Wiradjuri language was published in 2014.

Phonology

Consonants

Vowels 

The phonemes /ə/ and /aː/ tend to be considered as belonging to the same pair (refer to the orthography table below).

Sample vocabulary

"Wagga Wagga"

The Aboriginal inhabitants of the Wagga Wagga region were the Wiradjuri people and the term  and derivatives of that word in the Wiradjuri language are thought to mean 'crow'. To create the plural, reduplication is done, thus Wagga Wagga translates to 'the place of many crows'. It is also argued by some that the name means 'dances and celebrations', and others suggest the name means 'reeling like a drunken man'.

Ngamadidj
The term Ngamadidj ('ghost', or 'white people'), used in the Kuurn Kopan Noot language in Victoria, is also recorded as being used in Wellington, New South Wales by local Wiradjuri people about a missionary there.

Animals

Family

Numbers

Anatomy

Verbs

Other

Phrases

Introductions

Greetings

Love

Influence on English
The following English words come from Wiradjuri:
 kookaburra, a species of kingfisher
 quandong, a species of tree
 quarrion (or quarrien), another name for the cockatiel

Notes and references

Sources

External links
 
 A New Wiradjuri dictionary 
 profiles of Grant and Rudder
 Wiradjuri language, alphabet and pronunciation
 Materials for learning Wiradjuri
 Peter Andren MP with material on the Wiradjuri

 
 More information on Learning Wiradjuri
 Learn Wiradjuri at TAFE

Wiradhuric languages
 
Critically endangered languages
Endangered indigenous Australian languages in New South Wales